Common Ground is a 2000 Showtime television film directed by Donna Deitch and written by Paula Vogel, Terrence McNally and Harvey Fierstein.

Plot

"A Friend of Dorothy's"
In the 1950s, Dorothy Nelson (Brittany Murphy) joins the United States Navy where she meets the Friends of Dorothy, a code name for a group of gay and lesbian sailors. Nelson meets Billy (Jason Priestley), who takes her to an interracial nightclub that tolerates gay people. However, the NIS raids the nightclub, and Nelson is among those servicemembers who receive a blue discharge for "sexual perversion."  Returning to Homer, she tries to restart her life as a public school teacher, but her unfavorable discharge prevents her from getting a job. When her homosexuality becomes public knowledge, her mother expels her from the house, forcing her to seek shelter at a family friend's grocery store. However, the townspeople disapprove of this arrangement, and Nelson becomes homeless. An independent-minded woman named Janet (Helen Shaver) at the local diner defends her against the verbal harassment and advises Nelson to go to the bohemian Greenwich Village, a place where she might be free to be herself.

"Mr. Roberts"
The second story flashes forward to the town of Homer in the 1970s, towards the end of the Vietnam War. There a closeted gay high school French language teacher, Mr. Roberts (Steven Weber), has a student named Tobias Anderson, nicknamed Toby, (Jonathan Taylor Thomas) who is on the verge of coming out of the closet, and who he suspects wishes to confide in him. Roberts must keep his homosexuality a secret for the fear of losing his job, but his live-in boyfriend Gus (Scott McCord) pressures him to set a good example for the students by illustrating the importance of tolerance and justice. Toby visits a prostitute on the advice of his swimming coach, with the idea that she can help him "become a man", but rather instead gives him some good advice about being himself.

After Toby is sexually assaulted by bullies and is discovered by Roberts, Roberts then himself comes out to his students and lectures them on the evils of bias-motivated hatred. Toby graduates from high school and leaves Homer to attend college in the big city.

"Andy and Amos"
The final short story takes place in the present day (2000), when a father and the townspeople have to come to terms with the fact that two men will be getting married during a commitment ceremony to be held in the town.  Ira (Ed Asner), the father, is planning to lead a protest march against the wedding, while his son, Amos (James LeGros), is nervous about getting married and going against the cultural stereotype of gay men. The film ends on a positive note, with father and son reconciling and the wedding taking place as scheduled.

Cast
 Edward Asner as Ira
 Beau Bridges as Father Leon
 Harvey Fierstein as Don
 Brian Kerwin as Chuck Dawson
 Margot Kidder as Mrs. Nelson
 Erik Knudsen as Young Johnny Burroughs
 James LeGros as Amos
 Brittany Murphy as Dorothy Nelson
 Jason Priestley as Billy
 Mimi Rogers as McPherson
 Helen Shaver as Janet
 Eric Stoltz as Johnny Burroughs
 Jonathan Taylor Thomas as Tobias "Toby" Anderson
 Steven Weber as Gil Roberts
 Scott McCord as Gus
 Caterina Scorsone as Peggy

Production
A Friend of Dorothy's was written by Paula Vogel; Mr. Roberts was written by Terrence McNally; and Andy & Amos was written by Harvey Fierstein.

The plays star Brittany Murphy, Jason Priestley, Steven Weber, Jonathan Taylor Thomas, Edward Asner and James LeGros. The film contains three short stories about gay Americans during different time periods in the fictional town of Homer, Connecticut, and their efforts to find "common ground" or respect from the heterosexual majority.

References

External links

 

2000 films
American LGBT-related television films
Lesbian-related television shows
Films set in Connecticut
Films with screenplays by Terrence McNally
Showtime (TV network) films
2000 LGBT-related films
LGBT-related drama films
2000s English-language films
Films directed by Donna Deitch
2000s American films